Grosvenoria is a genus of South American shrubs and small trees in the family Asteraceae.

 Species

References

 
Asteraceae genera
Flora of the Andes
Taxonomy articles created by Polbot